The Eifelrennen was an annual motor race, organised by ADAC Automobile Club from 1922 to 2003, held in Germany's Eifel mountain region even before the Nürburgring was built there.

History 

Starting from 1922, the first races were held on a 33 km long combination of public roads around Nideggen, Wollersheim, Vlatten, Heimbach, Hasenfeld and other villages in the Eifel mountains, similar to the Targa Florio which was a very important race at that time, and popular in Germany due to two wins by Mercedes (still without Benz then).

In 1922, all vehicles were allowed, cars, motorbikes, and even bicycles with supporting engines. Over 100 entrants showed up to compete in the 10-lap event. The track was not paved, and muddy after heavy rains.
From 1924 to 1926, the races for 2 and 4 wheels were held on separate days, and classes were introduced. Still, several fatal accidents happened. Even spectator stands collapsed, caused by stormy weather.

The unsatisfying safety situation led to the construction of the Nürburgring circuit in that area, which was inaugurated on Saturday, 18 June 1927 by the 5. Eifelrennen weekend, starting with motorcycle races. On Sunday, Rudolf Caracciola won the first car race on a Mercedes-Benz S.

The Südschleife was used instead of the Nordschleife from 1928 until 1931 and from 1958 until 1968. 

The connection between the motorcycle and car races was discontinued in 1974, when organisers, drivers and German motorcycle Grand Prix riders disagreed on the best way to make the track safe for both kinds of racing - with straw bales or without? As a result, international contenders for the motorcycle World Championships boycotted the races, leaving the GP wins to rather unknown Germans (even to German fans) who decided to ride anyway.

After the modern Grand Prix track was built at the Nürburgring in 1984 and F2 was replaced with F3000, the Eifelrennen was discontinued as it always was associated with the long Nordschleife.

Later, the trademark was given to a standard rounds of the Deutsche Tourenwagen Meisterschaft and STW touring car racing on this short GP track. Often two separate races were held, thus two winners.

The last Eifelrennen was held in early May 2003 when several races were held, including an VLN endurance race on the 25.9 km full combined Nordschleife in preparation for the 24 Hours Nürburgring race three weeks later.

Currently there are no major race series cooperating with the ADAC to host a weekend as Eifelrennen.

ADAC Eifelrennen winners (motorcycles) 
Deutsche Tourist-Trophäe (German Tourist Trophy)
1922 Sixtus Meyer, Harley-Davidson 1000 ccm
1923 - No Race -
1924 Franz Bieber, BMW - (1000 ccm : Robert "Robby" Jecker, Harley-Davidson)
1925 Paul Weyres
1926 
1927 Toni Ulmen

ADAC Eifelrennen winners (automobiles) 
1922 Kurt C. Volkhart, Steiger
1923 - No Race -
1924 Wetzka / Haide, Austro-Daimler
1925 
1926 Felten, Mannesmann

ADAC Eifelrennen winners (automobiles) on the Nürburgring

References

External links 

 1922 
 1924 
 1927
 1930s

DAMC 05
Formula One non-championship races
Auto races in Germany
Auto races in West Germany
Motorcycle racing in Germany
Sport in Rhineland-Palatinate